The 2022–23 LSU Tigers basketball team represented Louisiana State University during the 2022–23 NCAA Division I men's basketball season. The team's head coach was Matt McMahon, in his first season at LSU. The Tigers played their home games at Pete Maravich Assembly Center in Baton Rouge, Louisiana as a member of the Southeastern Conference.

Previous season
The Tigers finished the season 22–12, 9–9 in SEC Play to finish a five-way tie for fifth place. As the No. 5 seed in the SEC tournament, they defeated Missouri in the Second Round, before losing in the quarterfinals to Arkansas. They received an at-large bid to the NCAA tournament as the No. 6 seed in the Midwest Region, where they were upset in the First Round by Iowa State.

Following the team's loss in the SEC Tournament, the school fired head coach Will Wade after receiving notification of significant NCAA violations by Wade. Assistant coach Kevin Nickelberry coached the team in their NCAA Tournament game. On March 21, 2022, the school named Murray State head coach Matt McMahon the team's new head coach.

Offseason

Departures

Incoming transfers

2022 recruiting class

2023 Recruiting class

Roster

Schedule and results

|-
!colspan=12 style=""|Regular season

|-
!colspan=12 style=""| SEC Tournament

Schedule Source

Rankings 

*AP does not release post-NCAA Tournament rankings^Coaches did not release a Week 2 poll

See also
2022–23 LSU Tigers women's basketball team

References

LSU Tigers basketball seasons
LSU
LSU
LSU